WOLZ (95.3 FM, "The Beach") is a radio station broadcasting an 80's hits format. Licensed to Fort Myers, Florida, United States, the station is currently owned by iHeartMedia, Inc.

On May 28, 2021, WOLZ rebranded from "95.3 OLZ" to "95.3 The Beach" and shifted their playlist with more 80s music.

WOLZ broadcasts in the HD Radio format.

Traffic Reporting  January 1991 through January 1993, live traffic reporting was provided during morning and afternoon drives.  Patrick Genualdi, CEO of Crosstown Traffic was the on air traffic personality, reporting from his aircraft, observing traffic over Fort Myers, Cape Coral, North Fort Myers, Fort Myers Beach and Sanibel Island.

References

External links

OLZ
Radio stations established in 1988
1988 establishments in Florida
Mass media in Fort Myers, Florida
IHeartMedia radio stations